Rosalia Samoilovna Zemlyachka, née Zalkind (20 March 187621 January 1947) was a Russian revolutionary and Soviet politician. As a revolutionary, she was best known by the alias Zemlyachka, though she also used the party pseudonyms 'Demon' and 'Osipov', and her married name was Samoilova.

Biography 
Rosalia Zalkind was born in Kyiv, (Kiev) the daughter of a wealthy Jewish merchant, Samuil Markovich Zalkind. She was educated in a girls' gymnasium in Kiev, and later at the Faculty of Medicine of the University of Lyon. From age of 17, she was involved in revolutionary activities. A member of the Russian Social Democratic Labour Party since 1898, Zemlyachka worked in Odessa and Yekaterinoslav as an agent for the Iskra newspaper, founded by Vladimir Lenin and Julius Martov.

Zemlyachka was a delegate to the Second Congress of the RSDLP, which convened in Brussels in July 1903, but she was arrested by the Belgian police and deported. When the RSDLP split into factions, she joined the Bolsheviks. She continued to support Lenin when he appeared to be losing control of Bolsheviks, who wanted to bring about a reconciliation of the factions of the RSDLP. In July 1904, she travelled to Geneva for the conference of hard line Bolsheviks who formed the 'Bureau of Majority Committees', the forerunner of the Central Committee of the Communist Party of the Soviet Union, to which she was elected, under the name 'Demon', on Lenin's recommendation. Afterwards she returned to Russia to build the Bolshevik organisation, visiting St Petersburg, Georgia, and Baku. 

In December 1905, she was in Moscow at the time of the Moscow uprising. After its failure, she insisted on a purge of the Moscow Bolshevik organisation. She was arrested in 1906, but escaped from a police station. She was arrested several times, and in October 1907 was imprisoned in the Lithuania Castle in St Petersburg. After her release in 1909, she was briefly the secretary of the Bolshevik organisation in Baku, before emigrating. She returned to Russia illegally in 1914, and took charge of illegal transport across the Finnish border. In 1915-16 she was the secretary of the Moscow party organisation.

After the February Revolution, Zemlyachka was appointed the secretary of the Moscow party committee. During the Bolshevik Revolution, she directed the armed uprising in the Rogozhsk-Simonovsky district of Moscow. In 1918, she supported the 'Left Communists', who opposed the signing of the Treaty of Brest-Litovsk. During the Russian Civil War, when she served as a military commissar on the southern front, she supported the 'military opposition', who objected to the deployment of former officers of the Russian Imperial Army.

Massacre of the 'Wrangelites' 
Zemlyachka was appointed secretary of the Crimean party committee in November 1920, when the last White Army left in the war, commanded by Baron Wrangel was evacuating the peninsula. Leaflets were dropped by aeroplane over Sevastopol, the last city held by the Whites, which offered an amnesty to those who surrendered to the Red Army. They signed in the name of the former commander-in-chief of the Imperial Army, General Aleksei Brusilov, who was persuaded to go to Crimea to supervise their surrender by the Deputy People's Commissar for War, Ephraim Sklyansky.  

Before Brusilov set out, a local decision was made to massacre those who had surrendered. The order to kill them was signed by Béla Kun, the head of the Crimean regional committee, Zemlyachka, and Semyon Dukelsky, the head of the Crimean branch of the Cheka. According to the historian Donald Rayfield, Kun and Zemlyachka were lovers, and she was "a Cheka sadist who tied the officers in pairs to planks and burned them alive in furnaces or drowned them in barges that she sank offshore. Estimates vary of the number killed, which may have been 70,000.

Later career 
Between 1921-24, Zemlyachka was the secretary of the Zamoskvoretsky district committee, Moscow. In 1924, she was sent to South East Russia. In 1925-26, she was the secretary of the Motovilikhsky district party committee, in Perm. Between 1924 and 1934, she was a member of the Central Control Commission. In 1926, she became a member of the collegium of Rabkrin and the head of its complaints bureau. According to a tribute written to mark the 110th anniversary of her birth, she involved hundreds of workers and party members in her campaigns against bureaucracy. She became so well known as "the scourge of bureaucrats and red-tape mongers" that a letter reached her from the provinces with the address 'Moscow, Comrade Zemlyachka'. In February 1934, she was appointed the head of the Transport Commission of the Soviet Control Commission, the successor organisation to Rabkrin.

As one of relatively few Old Bolsheviks to survive the Great Purge, Zemlyachka received a major promotion in May 1939, when she was appointed Chairman of the Soviet Control Commission and a Deputy Chairman of the USSR Council of Ministers. She is the only woman to have served at this level in the Stalinist period, and the first woman to be decorated with the Order of the Red Banner.

Zemlyachka died on 21 January, 1947 in Moscow. Her ashes were buried at the Kremlin Wall Necropolis.

Notes

Barbara Evans Clements, Bolshevik Women. Cambridge University Press, 1997,

External links 
 http://www.knowbysight.info/ZZZ/02728.asp (Russian)

1876 births
1947 deaths
Politicians from Kyiv
People from Kiev Governorate
Jews from the Russian Empire
Ukrainian Jews
Soviet Jews
Jewish Soviet politicians
Russian Social Democratic Labour Party members
Old Bolsheviks
People of the Russian Revolution
Central Committee of the Communist Party of the Soviet Union members
People's commissars and ministers of the Soviet Union
First convocation members of the Soviet of the Union
Second convocation members of the Soviet of the Union
Soviet women in politics
Left communists
Women in war
Politicide perpetrators
20th-century Russian women politicians
Recipients of the Order of the Red Banner
Recipients of the Order of Lenin
University of Lyon alumni